The North Atlantic garbage patch is a garbage patch of man-made marine debris found floating within the North Atlantic Gyre, originally documented in 1972. Based on a 22-year research study conducted by the Sea Education Association, the patch is estimated to be hundreds of kilometers across in size, with a density of more than 200,000 pieces of debris per square kilometer. The source of the garbage originates from human-created waste traveling from the rivers into the ocean and mainly consists of microplastics. The garbage patch is a large risk to wildlife (and to humans) through plastic consumption and entanglement. There have only been a few awareness and clean-up efforts for the North Atlantic garbage patch such as The Garbage Patch State at UNESCO and The Ocean Cleanup, as most of the research and cleanup efforts have been done for the Great Pacific garbage patch, a similar garbage patch in the north Pacific.

Characteristics

Location and size 
The patch is located from 22°N to 38°N and its western and eastern boundaries are unclear. The debris zone shifts by as much as 1,600 km (990 mi) north and south seasonally, and drifts even farther south during the El Niño-Southern Oscillation, according to the NOAA. The patch is estimated to be hundreds of kilometers across in size, with a density of more than 200,000 pieces of debris per square kilometer (one piece per five square metres, on average). The concentration of plastic in the North Atlantic garbage patch has stayed mostly constant even though global plastic production has increased five-fold over the course of the 22-year study. This may be caused by the plastics sinking beneath the surface or breaking down into smaller pieces that can pass through the net.

Sources 
The North Atlantic garbage patch originates from human-created waste that travels from continental rivers into the ocean. Once the trash has made it into the ocean, it is centralized by gyres, which collect trash in large masses. The surface of the garbage patch consists of microplastics such as polyethylene and polypropylene which make up common household items. Denser material that is thought to exist under the surface of the ocean includes plastic called polyethylene terephthalate that is used to make soft drink and water bottles. However, these denser plastics are not observed in the North Atlantic garbage patch because the methods to collect samples only capture the surface microplastics.

Research 
A joint study by the Sea Education Association, Woods Hole Oceanographic Institution, and the University of Hawaii at Manoa collected plastic samples in the western North Atlantic and Caribbean Sea from 1986 to 2008. Nearly 7,000 students from the SEA semester program conducted 6,136 surface plankton net tows on board SEA's sailing research vessels over 22 years, yielding more than 64,000 plastic pieces, mostly fragments less than 10mm in size with nearly all lighter than 0.05g. Nikolai Maximenko of the University of Hawaii in Honolulu developed a computer model to describe how plastics are accumulated from converging surface currents to form garbage patches.  The model uses data from more than 1,600 satellite-tracked trajectories of drifting buoys to map out surface currents.  The plastic data collected by the students at SEA validated Maximenko's model, and researchers were able to successfully predict the plastic accumulation in the North Atlantic Ocean.

Awareness and clean-up efforts 
 
Few efforts have been made to clean up the North Atlantic Garbage Patch, as removing the microplastics "would likely cause as much harm as good because of all the other small creatures in the ocean that would get filtered out too". On 11 April 2013, in order to create awareness, artist Maria Cristina Finucci founded The Garbage Patch State at UNESCO –Paris in front of Director General Irina Bokova. The Garbage Patch State was first in a series of events under the patronage of UNESCO and of Italian Ministry of the Environment, sparking a series of art exhibits across the world used to bring attention to the size and severity of the garbage patches and incite awareness and action.

Dutch inventor Boyan Slat and his nonprofit organization The Ocean Cleanup is developing advanced technologies to rid the oceans of plastic. Cleanup is planned to start in the Great Pacific Garbage Patch first, and eventually move around to the other patches across the globe. Aside from cleaning the microplastics from the oceans, the Ocean Cleanup is also developing technologies to remove larger pieces of plastic from rivers, which are largely attributed as the main sources of plastic in the ocean.

See also 

 Ecosystem of the North Pacific Subtropical Gyre
 Great Pacific garbage patch
 Indian Ocean garbage patch
 Plastisphere
 Sargasso Sea

References

External links 

 Sargasso Sea Alliance 
 Plastics at SEA: North Atlantic Expedition
 The Ocean Cleanup Array

Atlantic Ocean
Marine garbage patches
1972 in the environment